Madha Mathu Manasi is a 2016 Indian Kannada-language romantic comedy film written and directed by Sathish Pradhan. The film was co-produced and the music was composed by Mano Murthy. It starred Prajwal Devaraj and Shruti Hariharan in the lead roles. Cinematography was by K. S. Chandra Shekar. The film was released with mixed reviews. It was dubbed into Hindi As Anth in 2018 by Pen Movies.

The filming took place in Bengaluru, Madikeri and Mattur and took five months to complete. It was released on 25 November 2016.

Cast
 Prajwal Devaraj as Mass Madha
 Shruti Hariharan as Manasi
 Rangayana Raghu
 Bullet Prakash
 Pawan
 Shobharaj
 Vanishri
 Anushree as an item number
 Shamanth Shetty as Deepak

Soundtrack
Mano Murthy composed the score and original soundtrack for the film. The lyrics were written by Jayanth Kaikini and Sathish Pradhan.

Track listing

References

2016 films
Indian romantic drama films
2010s Kannada-language films
Films scored by Mano Murthy
2016 romantic drama films
2010s masala films